Primera Air Scandinavia and Primera Air Nordic served the following destinations as of September 2018 prior to declaring bankruptcy and ceasing all operations on 1 October 2018.

Destinations

References

Primera Air